Mladen Kovačevič (born  in SFR Yugoslavia) is a retired Slovenian football player, who played as a striker. He played 10 seasons with Gorica. He scored 36 goals in 150 appearances in the Slovenian first division.

External links
PrvaLiga profile 

1980 births
Living people
Slovenian footballers
Association football forwards
ND Gorica players
Slovenian PrvaLiga players